The Jaffna Cultural Centre (Tamil: யாழ்ப்பாணக் கலாசார மத்திய நிலையம்), also known as the Saraswathi Mahal, is a cultural centre in Jaffna, Sri Lanka. It was opened on 11 February 2023 by President Ranil Wickremesinghe and other Indian and Sri Lankan dignitaries. The centre includes an auditorium, conference hall, amphitheatre and a digital library.

Background
Indian Prime Minister Narendra Modi laid the foundation stone for the cultural centre in 2015. The centre would be built at a cost of 11 million USD, with external fundings from India.

The centre was completed in early 2020 but would not be officially inaugurated until three years later, due to uncertainty surrounding its leadership and funding.

In 2022, the centre was inaugurated virtually by then Prime Minister of Sri Lanka Mahinda Rajapaksa and Foreign Minister of India Dr. S. Jaishankar, who was on a three day visit to Sri Lanka. After its inauguration, the centre remained closed for nearly a year due to the economic and political instability in the country at the time. It was officially reopened by President Ranil Wickremesinghe and Indian Union Minister Dr. L. Murugan on 11 February 2023.

See also 
India–Sri Lanka relations

References

2023 establishments in Sri Lanka
Cultural buildings in Jaffna
India–Sri Lanka relations